Arapahoe Creek is a stream in Andrew and Nodaway counties of northwest Missouri. It is a tributary to the Nodaway River.

The stream headwaters arise in southwest Nodaway County about 4.5 miles southwest of the community of Barnard and west of U.S. Route 71. The stream flows south into Andrew County and flows southwest to its confluence with the Nodaway River about 2.5 miles northwest of the community of Fillmore. Holt County lies on the west side of the Nodaway River at the confluence.

Arapahoe Creek was named after the Arapaho Native Americans.

See also
List of rivers of Missouri

References

Rivers of Andrew County, Missouri
Rivers of Nodaway County, Missouri
Rivers of Missouri